KNLE-FM (88.1 FM) is a radio station  broadcasting a Christian preaching/Christian talk format. Licensed to Round Rock, Texas, United States, the station serves the Austin area.  The station is currently owned by Ixoye Productions, Inc. and is a listener supported station. Before 2022, from at least 2010 onwards, KNLE played independent Christian music submitted by its listeners, as well as some Christian preaching.
However, by September 2022 KNLE switched to its current Christian Talk format.

History
The station went on the air as KHCS-FM on 1981-08-06.  on 1987-01-07, the station changed its call sign to the current KNLE.

References

External links 

NLE-FM
Contemporary Christian radio stations in the United States
Radio stations established in 1981
NLE